The 1873 Berwickshire by-election was fought on 27 June 1873.  The by-election was fought due to the elevation to the peerage of the incumbent MP of the Liberal Party, David Robertson.  It was won by the Liberal candidate William Miller.

References

1873 in Scotland
1870s elections in Scotland
Berwickshire
Politics of the Scottish Borders
1873 elections in the United Kingdom
By-elections to the Parliament of the United Kingdom in Scottish constituencies